Denmark–Vietnam relations relates to foreign relations between Denmark and Vietnam.  Both countries established diplomatic relations on November 25, 1971.  On April 1, 1994, Denmark established an embassy in Hanoi, and since August 12, 2000, Vietnam has had an embassy in Copenhagen.

Vietnamese migration
Approximately 8,500 Vietnamese live in Denmark.

They were heavily impacted by the Vietnam War.

Agreements
In 2002, the two countries signed an environment protection agreement.
In 2007, the two countries signed a framework agreement on the Danish general credit programme for Vietnam.

Bilateral visits 
 September 1999, Vietnamese Prime Minister Phan Văn Khải visited Denmark.
 June 2002, Nguyen Dzy Nien Vietnamese Foreign minister visited Denmark
 October 2004, Per Stig Møller Danish Minister of Foreign Affairs attended the 5th Asia–Europe Meeting in Hanoi
 March 2007, Ulrik Federspiel Danish Minister of Foreign Affairs visited Vietnam.
 November 2009, Queen Margrethe II of Denmark visited Vietnam.
 March 2013, Villy Søvndal

See also 
 Foreign relations of Denmark
 Foreign relations of Vietnam
 Vietnam–European Union relations

References

 

 
Vietnam
Bilateral relations of Vietnam